Wolfgang David (born Wolfgang Sengstschmid in St. Pölten, Lower Austria) is an Austrian violinist.

Biography 
Viennese violinist Wolfgang David (born Wolfgang Sengstschmid in St. Pölten, Austria), established himself on the international stage as recitalist and soloist with some of today's leading orchestras, including the Royal Philharmonic Orchestra, Vienna Radio Symphony Orchestra, Tonkünstler Orchestra, Johannesburg Philharmonic Orchestra, Berne Symphony Orchestra, and New York Virtuosi.

He has been well received by the press – The Washington Post wrote that he "scaled the heights of musicmaking" and the March 2001 edition of the British music magazine The Strad described his playing “as emotionally wide-ranging as one could hope for.”

Discography 
 Violin Concerto (2009)
 Royal Philharmonic Orchestra
 Emmanuel Siffert, conductor
 Wolfgang David, violin
 Peter Zazofsky, piano
 The Royal Lullaby (2006)
 Royal Philharmonic Orchestra
 Emmanuel Siffert, conductor
 Wolfgang David, violin
 Indhuon Srikaranonda, piano
 The New Canon (2005/2006)
 Wolfgang David, violin
 David Gompper, piano
 Star of the Country Down (2005/2006)
 Wolfgang David, violin
 David Gompper, piano
 Finnegan's Wake (2003)
 Wolfgang David, violin
 David Gompper, piano
 Viva concertante (2005/2006)
 Slovak Radio Orchestra
 Kirk Trevor, conductor
 Wolfgang David, violin
 Elisabeth Kropfitsch, violin

References

External links 
 www.wolfgangdavid.com - Official Website

Lía Aguilar

Austrian violinists
Male violinists
Year of birth missing (living people)
Living people
University of Music and Performing Arts Vienna alumni
21st-century violinists
21st-century male musicians